Bertelsen Glacier is a glacier in northern Greenland. Administratively it belongs to the Northeast Greenland National Park. Between 2006 and 2010 there was an automatic weather station near the glacier.

The glacier was mapped with accuracy by Lauge Koch during an aerial survey in May 1938. It had previously not been seen by Robert Peary during his 1902 exploration of the area that put the adjacent Moore Glacier in the map. The glacier was named in honour of Aage Bertelsen, who had taken part in the 1906–1908 Danmark Expedition.

Geography 
The Bertelsen Glacier is one of the main glaciers in eastern Peary Land. It is a valley glacier, a branch of the larger, northwest-flowing Moore Glacier, joining it from the northeast. It is located in the area of the easternmost subranges of the Roosevelt Range, between the H. H. Benedict Range to the southwest and the Daly Range to the northeast.

See also
List of glaciers in Greenland
Peary Land

References

External links
Ice-marginal processes, sediments and landforms at Moore Glacier, northernmost Greenland
Manliness and Exploration: The Discovery of the North Pole

Glaciers of Greenland
Roosevelt Range